Hans-Joachim Haase is the name of the following persons:

 Hans-Joachim Haase (optician) (1915–2001), German optician
 Hans-Joachim Haase (psychiatrist) (1922–1997), German psychiatrist